The 29th America's Cup was contested between the winner of the 1995 Citizen Cup, Team Stars & Stripes, which switched to the yacht Young America (USA 36) for the competition, and the winner of the 1995 Louis Vuitton Cup, Team New Zealand, with the yacht Black Magic (NZL 32). New Zealand swept all five races to take the cup away from the US for only the second time in 144 years. For the first time since 1930, the format changed to a best-of-nine series, which remained through 2007.

Races

Crew

Team New Zealand

Team Stars & Stripes

References

ultimatesail.com

 
1995
America's Cup, 1995
Sports competitions in San Diego
1995 in American sports